Jane Lewis may refer to:

 Jane Lewis (academic) (born 1950), British social scientist and academic
 Jane Lewis (journalist), Scottish sports journalist and broadcaster